Dipang Lake is a freshwater lake located in the Lekhnath municipality of Kaski, Nepal.

It is the fourth-largest lake among the seven lakes of Lekhnath to be listed in the wetland list of the world. It is famous as a picnic spot from where HImalayas and green hills can be seen. It is also known for wild lotus and swan.

References

Lakes of Gandaki Province
Kaski District